Owen Campbell (born 1994) is an American actor.  He played the lead roles in the films As You Are (2016) and Super Dark Times (2017).  On television, he played Jared Connors in The Americans.

Early life
Campbell was born to father Don Campbell.  He grew up in Brooklyn and attended Fiorello H. LaGuardia High School.

Filmography

Film

Television

References

External links

Living people
21st-century American male actors
American male film actors
American male television actors
1995 births
Male actors from New York (state)
Male actors from New York City
People from Brooklyn